The Mutiny of the Elsinore is a 1937 British action film directed by Roy Lockwood and starring Lyn Harding, Jiro Soneya and Paul Lukas. The screenplay concerns a mutiny on a ship against a brutal captain. It was an adaptation of the 1914 novel The Mutiny of the Elsinore by Jack London.

Plot summary
Following a mutiny on a ship against a brutal captain, a writer who happens to be aboard as a passenger is asked to take over.

Cast
 Lyn Harding as Mr. Pike 
 Jiro Soneya as Wada
 Paul Lukas as Jack Pethurst 
 Kathleen Kelly as Margaaret West 
 Graham Soutten as Sidney Waltham
 Michael Martin Harvey as Charles Davis 
 Clifford Evans as Bert Rhyne 
 Conway Dixon as Captain West 
 Tony Sympson as Shorty Peabody 
 Pat Noonan as Murphy 
 Alec Fraser as Benson
 Hamilton Keene as Twist 
 William Devlin as O'Sullivan

References

External links

1937 films
1930s historical action films
Films directed by Roy Lockwood
Films based on American novels
Films based on works by Jack London
Seafaring films
Films set in the 19th century
British historical action films
British black-and-white films
1930s English-language films
1930s British films